"My Avatar" is the fifth Japanese single by South Korean boy band  Boyfriend from their 5th Japanese single album of the same name. This single was released physically on March 26, 2014.

Background and promotion 
On March 6, 2014, Boyfriend released the PV teaser for their double A-side single "My Avatar". In the teaser, the members wore black and white outfits and make up, showing their manly charisma. The single was released in 4 different versions: Standard Edition (CD), Limited Edition A (CD+DVD), Limited Edition B (CD+DVD), and LAWSON/HMV Limited Edition (2CD).

Track listing

Music videos

Charts

Oricon

References

Boyfriend (band) songs
2014 songs
2014 singles
Japanese-language songs
Starship Entertainment singles